Tension War is a 2011 album by Moving Units, their fourth release. The EP includes three brand new songs, one re-interpretation and two new remixes by We Are Enfant Terrible (Last Gang) and Spirituals (Lefse).

Track listing

"Liquid X"
"Until She Says"
"Pink Redemption"
"Paris, New Mexico"
"Until She Says (We Are Enfant Terrible Remix)"
"Until She Says (Spirituals Remix)"

References

External links
Official Site

Moving Units albums
2011 albums